is a station on the Tama Toshi Monorail Line in Tachikawa, Tokyo, Japan.

Lines
Izumi-taiikukan Station is a station on the Tama Toshi Monorail Line and is located 3.0 kilometers from the terminus of the line at Kamikitadai Station.

Station layout
Izumi-Taiikukan Station is a raised station with two tracks and two opposed side platforms, with the station building located underneath. It is a standardized station building for this monorail line.

Platforms

Adjacent stations

History
The station opened on 27 November 1998.

Station numbering was introduced in February 2018 with Izumi-taiikukan being assigned TT14.

Surrounding area
The station is above Tokyo Metropolitan Route 43 (Imokubo Kaidō). The surrounding area is primarily residential. Other points of interest include:
 Tachikawa Municipal Izumi Gymnasium
 Tokyo Metropolitan Sunagawa Senior High School
 Tachikawa City Fifth Junior High School
 TOTO Tachikawa Showroom

References

External links

 Tama Monorail Izumi-Taiikukan Station 

Railway stations in Japan opened in 1998
Railway stations in Tokyo
Tama Toshi Monorail
Tachikawa, Tokyo